On Nut is a khwaeng (subdistrict) of Suan Luang District, in Bangkok, Thailand. It was created in 2017, split off from Suan Luang Subdistrict along with Phatthanakan Subdistrict.

In 2020, it had a total population of 44,427 people.

References

Subdistricts of Bangkok
Suan Luang district